The Blaine County Courthouse in Hailey, Idaho is a historic building built in 1883 to serve Alturas County, which later became Blaine County.  It is a three-story building that held county offices, a jail, and a courtroom, and, at $40,000 building cost, was the most expensive building in the Idaho Territory, hurting Alturas County financially. Located at 1st and Croy Sts., it was designed by Horace Greeley Knapp in Italianate style.  It was listed on the National Register of Historic Places in 1978.

The brick building stands on a raised cutstone basement.  According to its National Register nomination, its "most striking features are its cast iron window sills. Originally cast iron pediments capped these windows as well."

References

Courthouses on the National Register of Historic Places in Idaho
Italianate architecture in Idaho
Government buildings completed in 1883
Buildings and structures in Blaine County, Idaho
County courthouses in Idaho
National Register of Historic Places in Blaine County, Idaho